Living Films is an international film production company based in Thailand. They have produced feature films, documentaries, commercials, and television series including The Hangover Part II, Shanghai (2010 film), and Changeland. Its most recent projects include the Netflix / BBC TV series The Serpent (TV series), the Netflix film Fistful of Vengeance, Ron Howard’s film Thirteen Lives, and episodes of Disney’s series Ms. Marvel (TV series).

History
Living Films was founded by Chris Lowenstein in 1996. Lowenstein studied film at Beloit College in Wisconsin and began his career as a production assistant for Gus Van Sant working on the film My Own Private Idaho. He also worked as a production assistant for the Thailand filming of Heaven & Earth in 1993. After similar work with the films Operation Dumbo Drop and The Quest, Lowenstein opened his own production company in Chiang Mai. Living Films produces feature films, commercials, still-photo shoots and television projects.

In 2006, during the filming of Bangkok Dangerous starring Nicolas Cage, the ruling government of Thailand was overthrown. In 2013, A fire broke out on the set of No Escape (then called The Coup) starring Owen Wilson, Pierce Brosnan, and Lake Bell. There were no injuries to cast and production had wrapped for the day. The fire was thought to have been caused by faulty power supply.

Filmography

Film

Television

References

External links
 Official website
 Living Films on IMDb

Film production companies of Thailand
Television production companies of Thailand
Mass media companies established in 1996